Symplocos coccinea is a species of plant in the family Symplocaceae. It is endemic to Mexico.  It is threatened by habitat loss.

References

Endemic flora of Mexico
coccinea
Vulnerable plants
Taxa named by Aimé Bonpland
Taxa named by Alexander von Humboldt
Taxonomy articles created by Polbot